The 2004 Commonwealth Youth Games, officially known as the II Commonwealth Youth Games, and commonly known as Bendigo 2004, a regional sporting event that was held from 30 November to 3 December 2004 in Bendigo, Australia. They were the second Commonwealth Youth Games, which are held every four years. Bendigo would go on to be one of the host cities of the regional 2026 Commonwealth Games in Victoria.

Sports

The following sports were included in the 2004 Games:

Medal Count 

This is the full table of the medal count of the Commonwealth Youth Games 2004.

External links
 Official Website of the 2004 Commonwealth Youth Games

Australia and the Commonwealth of Nations
2004
Commonwealth Youth Games
Commonwealth Youth Games
Youth sport in Australia
Multi-sport events in Australia
International sports competitions hosted by Australia
Sport in Bendigo
2004 in youth sport